Büssing AG was a German bus and truck manufacturer, established in 1903 by Heinrich Büssing (1843–1929) in Braunschweig. It quickly evolved to one of the largest European producers, whose utility vehicles with the Brunswick Lion emblem were widely distributed, especially from the 1930s onwards. The company was taken over by MAN AG in 1971.

Heinrich Büssing

At the age of 60, the inventor and businessman Heinrich Büssing together with his two sons founded the Heinrich-Büssing-Spezialfabrik für Motorwagen und Motoromnibusse. Büssing, the son of a blacksmith dynasty at Nordsteimke (in present-day Wolfsburg), had studied engineering at the Collegium Carolinum in Braunschweig and had founded several bicycle, engineering and railway signal works with varying degrees of success. His first truck was a 2-ton payload machine powered by a 2-cylinder gasoline engine and featuring worm drive. That successful design was later built under license by other companies in Germany, Austria, Hungary and by Straker-Squire in England.

One year later he debuted a first 20 HP omnibus model carrying up to twelve passengers on the route from Braunschweig to Wendeburg, operated by his own Automobil-Omnibus-Betriebs-Gesellschaft. Büssing busses soon served public transport in European cities like Berlin (ABOAG), Vienna and Prague (Fross–Büssing), or London.

History 

Before World War I Büssing started to build heavy-duty trucks for the time. These trucks featured 4- and 6-cylinder engines (5 tonnes and 11 tonnes, respectively). In 1914 the Büssing A5P armored car was developed at the behest of the German Oberste Heeresleitung. After the war, Heinrich Büssing had to enter a Kommanditgesellschaft limited partnership, converted into the Büssing AG joint-stock company in 1922. In 1923, Büssing introduced the first rigid three-axle chassis which was used in upcoming models and allowed Büssing to lead the market share in Germany in commercial vehicles. Fleets of their double and single deck buses ran on the streets of Berlin and were a common sight in the interwar years.

Büssing NAG used inmates of several Nazi concentration camps in Braunschweig from 1944 to March 1945 for slave labor. These camps were subcamps to the Neuengamme concentration camp.

After World War II civilian production resumed with 5-tonne and later 7-tonne trucks.
In 1950, the company name became Büssing Nutzkraftwagen GmbH and production was concentrated on underfloor-engined trucks which were to become the firm's speciality. Most tractor units and all normal-control trucks had vertical engines, but in the mid 1960s there was a version of their Commodore maximum-weight tractor unit, the 16-210, which had a horizontal diesel mounted under the cab ahead of the front axle, the gearbox being mounted halfway along the truck's chassis.

In 1969, Büssing started strong ties with MAN AG. MAN was a customer to some Büssing's innovative trucks and parts while they were promoting their own line-up. In 1971, an MAN takeover of Büssing was announced. MAN started to use the lion logo on its newly named "MAN-Büssing" trucks. Büssing's unique underfloor-engined truck range continued in production under the MAN AG through to the late 1980s.

Acquisitions 
 First acquisition for Büssing was Mannesmann-Mulag Motoren und Lastwagen AG of Aachen.
 Elbing plant of Automobil Fabrik Kornnick AG.
 In 1934, Neue Automobil Gesellschaft (NAG). After the takeover Büssing used the brand Büssing-NAG until 1950.
 Büssing took over the Borgward plant at Osterholz-Scharmbeck in 1962. This plant used for building military 4-tonne 4x4. (1968 Factory was sold to Faun-Werke GmbH)

Innovations 
1923: The Büssing III GL 6 is the world's first full-size bus
 1930s: Büssing began building heavy duty trucks with diesel engines
 1936: Büssing pioneered the horizontal "underfloor" diesel engines
 During World War II Büssing once again supplied military vehicles including 6x4 armoured cars and an 8x8 with all-wheel steering.

Trolleybus production 
Büssing manufactured trolleybuses between 1933 and 1966, producing approximately 71 models.  Most were for German cities, but production also included three trolleybuses for Chernyakhovsk, Russia, in 1939; four for Copenhagen, Denmark, in 1940–42; and 14 for Lucerne, Switzerland, in 1965. In Turkey, ESHOT converted 21 Büssing motorbuses into trolleybuses in 1962 and 1968 (these are not counted in the total of 71 given above). At least four Büssing trolleybuses have been preserved, including ones at the Frankfurt Transport Museum, (:de:Verkehrsmuseum Frankfurt am Main) at the Hannoversches Straßenbahn-Museum and at the Historama transport museum in Ferlach, Austria.

See also
 Borgward
 Magirus
 MAN SE
 Henschel
 Neue Automobil Gesellschaft

Notes 

 

Defunct bus manufacturers
Defunct truck manufacturers
Defunct motor vehicle manufacturers of Germany
Vehicle manufacturing companies established in 1903
MAN SE
Trolleybus manufacturers
Companies based in Braunschweig
Vehicle manufacturing companies disestablished in 1971
1971 disestablishments in West Germany
Bus manufacturers of Germany
Electric vehicle manufacturers of Germany
German companies established in 1903